The Town of Bonanza is a statutory town located in Saguache County, Colorado, United States. The town population was 17 at the 2020 United States Census. Formerly known as Bonanza City, Bonanza is a largely abandoned former silver mining town. Bonanza is a Spanish language word meaning prosperity.

History
In 1880, Tom Cooke of Salida stumbled upon ore deposits while searching for horses. Prospectors flocked to this location and the town of Bonanza City was founded. In the first two years of its existence, its population ballooned to between 1,000 and 1,500.  At the time, population of mining towns was determined by the number of saloons and dance halls instead of a census taker and at this time, Bonanza City had 36 saloons and 7 dance halls.

Geography
Bonanza is located at  (38.295138, −106.140158) at an altitude of 9500 feet.

Demographics

As of the census of 2000, there were 14 people, 7 households, and 3 families residing in the town. The racial makeup of the town was 71.43% White, 7.14% Asian, and 21.43% from two or more races.

There were 7 households, out of which 14.3% had children under the age of 18 living with them, 42.9% were married couples living together, and 57.1% were non-families. 42.9% of all households were made up of individuals, and none had someone living alone who was 65 years of age or older. The average household size was 2.00 and the average family size was 3.00.

In the town, the population was spread out, with 7.1% under the age of 18, 28.6% from 18 to 24, 14.3% from 25 to 44, 50.0% from 45 to 64, . The median age was 44 years. For every 100 females, there were 180.0 males. For every 100 females age 18 and over, there were 160.0 males.

The median income for a household in the town was $63,750, and the median income for a family was $27,000. The per capita income for the town was $66,857. None of the population and none of the families were below the poverty line.

See also

 List of municipalities in Colorado

References

External links

 Bonanza Colorado Townsite Ghost town
 CDOT map of the Town of Bonanza
 Bonanza: A History of Mining
 Photos by Steve Garufi

Towns in Saguache County, Colorado
Towns in Colorado